N. Velzer House and Caretaker's Cottage is a historic home and cottage located at Centerport in Suffolk County, New York. The house is a -story, three-bay clapboard structure flanked by -story, two-bay, gable-roofed wings. It was built about 1830 and exhibits restrained Greek Revival details.  The cottage is a -story, clapboard residence with a shallow gable roof and a three-bay, side-hall plan.

It was added to the National Register of Historic Places in 1985. The properties of the house and the cottage are divided by a private road leading to some condominiums.

References

External links
New York MPS Velzer, N., House and Caretaker's Cottage (National Archives Catalog)
"N. Velzer House and Caretaker's Cottage (LandmarkHunter)

Houses on the National Register of Historic Places in New York (state)
Houses completed in 1830
Houses in Suffolk County, New York
1830 establishments in New York (state)
National Register of Historic Places in Suffolk County, New York